The 1984 Cleveland Browns season was the team's 35th season with the National Football League. At the season's mid-way point, head coach Sam Rutigliano was fired after starting 1–7. He was replaced by defensive coordinator Marty Schottenheimer, who went 4–4 to finish the season. (Schottenheimer would coach the Browns until 1988, guiding the Browns to a .620 winning percentage in his tenure with the team.)

Personnel

Staff

Roster

Schedule 

Note: Intra-division opponents are in bold text.

Standings

Game Summaries

Week 11 (Sunday, November 11, 1984): vs. San Francisco 49ers 

Point spread: 49ers by 6
 Over/Under: 35.0 (over)
 Time of Game:

Week 12: at Atlanta

Week 13 at Houston 
Paul McDonald threw three touchdown passes, two to Brian Brennan and the Browns defense stifled the Houston offense. The Browns are 3-2 under Marty Schotteheimer and the 27 points were the most their offense has scored this season. "The Browns is a very active team, using all their assets", said Oilers' coach Hugh Campbell.

References

External links 
 1984 Cleveland Browns at Pro-Football-Reference.com 
 1984 Cleveland Browns Statistics at jt-sw.com
 1984 Cleveland Browns Schedule at jt-sw.com
 1984 Cleveland Browns at DatabaseFootball.com  

Cleveland
Cleveland Browns seasons
Cleveland